North Korea has eight main motorways.

See also
Transport in North Korea

Roads in North Korea
North Korea